Rudderless is a 2014 American musical drama film which was the directorial debut of William H. Macy, and stars Billy Crudup, Anton Yelchin, Felicity Huffman, Selena Gomez and Laurence Fishburne. The film premiered at the 2014 Sundance Film Festival on January 24, 2014. The film was released in theaters and through video-on-demand beginning October 17, 2014.

Plot

The film opens as Josh Manning (Miles Heizer) is recording his own songs in his college dorm room for demo and is interrupted by one of his floor mates looking for someone. He stops recording, annoyed at the interruption. Meanwhile, his father Sam Manning (Billy Crudup) has succeeded in landing a large account at his advertising firm, and calls Josh to celebrate with him and skip that day's classes. Josh tells him he cannot make it but his father insists, though Josh begins to make his way to the campus library anyway. Sam continues to wait at the bar where he told him to meet him and even leaves a message for Josh who has apparently stood him up. He is distracted by a news report of a school shooting incident at his son's campus library on the television in the bar.

Later, a memorial wake is being held at Josh's home by his mother, Emily (Felicity Huffman). It is inferred that Josh was one of the victims in the shooting. Due to the media coverage received, Sam has a difficult time being able to grieve in his own way with press being cordoned at the end of the street by police, and a news helicopter hovering above the family home. Sam is consoled by family and attendees while sitting alone to one side as his wife is greeting others. Sam walks into Josh's bedroom to look around, attempting to find some kind of understanding over the loss, and is interrupted by Kate Lucas (Selena Gomez), who tells Sam that she and Josh had been dating the year prior. Sam then makes his way to his own home and finds the media coverage is interfering with his daily life, and he eventually succumbs to alcoholism, as far as showing up intoxicated at his firm; acting erratically and kissing his receptionist in a drunken state, for which his employer is advising him to take time off to better cope with the situation.

Two years later, Sam has removed himself from his former life and is now living on a sailboat on a lake, far from home, having taken a job as a contractor's assistant and for the most part drinking away his free time. His habits are causing habitual lateness and annoying his employer, who cautions Sam about repeated lateness. Getting up to relieve himself from the side of the boat has caught the chagrin of the governing board of the lake and the "wrath" of Alaird Dupree (because it is openly visible to other tenants and the small seafood restaurant nearby), the agent acting on behalf of the board. It is clear he dislikes Sam, and the feeling is very much mutual. Going for a drink with some coworkers after his day of working, he hides the details of his previous life and his true identity from everyone, even making up humorous stories about his past. (He tells his coworkers that he "fingered" Gotti and is in the protection of the Federal Witness Protection Program), Sam notices that "The Trill" tavern hosts open mic events for musicians.

Returning to the marina, he encounters his ex wife waiting for him, who says she is moving to Tulsa and is now the mother of a new son. She requires his signature to place their former house up for sale. She has also brought the remainder of Josh's possessions—demo discs, instruments and gear—which Sam emphatically states he has no room for on his tiny sailboat. Emily tells him she was certain he would want it because they had played music together since Josh was younger. Hours pass after Emily leaves. He tries his best to ignore the collection of his son's possessions over a meal. He storms over to where Emily had left it beside the road and begins to place it in a dumpster but stops, noticing the notebooks and discs, and begins to listen to them back on the boat, and read through the collection of lyrics and writings Josh left behind. He even begins to teach himself some of his son's material. After work the next day, Sam decides to perform "Home", one of Josh's songs, at The Trill, and catches the attention of Quentin (Anton Yelchin), a young guitarist who was excitedly moved by the performance.  The next day, Quentin brings Sam coffee and food and discusses the previous night performance, stating he believes there are other songs, and if there are, they could perform them together. Sam declares he is not interested, and continues to listen to more and teach himself his son's material.

Quentin tries again the next day and shows him an alternate arrangement possibility for the song. The two end up sharing a meal and playing instruments together for the rest of the night. Sam neglects to tell Quentin that he was not the piece's actual author. At the end of the night, Quentin gets Sam to agree to perform together at The Trill, adding more and more to each arrangement, including a percussion section in the way of Aiken. The next day, Sam is introduced to Del (Laurence Fishburne), the owner and operator of the local music supply store, who reveals that he is selling his business and plans to retire and tour by motor home with his wife in his later years. Quentin shows Sam the 1978 Gibson Les Paul hanging in the store, but is unable to afford it (a source of good-natured joking between Quentin and Del). Upon leaving the store, Sam watches a staged meeting between Quentin and Willy, a bass guitarist, in hopes that they can include him in their performances, but Sam is resistant to starting a band. The next day, the quartet meet to practice in the garage beneath Quentin’s apartment, and Quentin is very evasive about his own past. The group, now complete, has impressed The Trill owner (played by director William H. Macy) who asks them to perform regularly on Saturday nights as house entertainment, to which the band agrees—even Sam, reluctantly. The new name, “Rudderless”, quickly gains notoriety and local fame. Meanwhile, Quentin is revealed as extremely shy of the opposite sex, which Sam attempts to help him through, though Quentin finds the advice generally unhelpful.

Sam arrives at Quentin's apartment one afternoon and meets his mother, Joyce, who Sam mistakes as an older prostitute after seeing Quentin hand her a small amount of cash as they hug. Quentin is embarrassed because his mother has had issues with (unspecified) responsibilities, even spending his junior year of high school living in a car, and has vowed never to lower himself to that level of poverty again. At the mall, Sam buys Quentin new clothing to give him a style, and develop confidence from it. It does help a little, and Quentin begins to enjoy the attention Rudderless has gained him.

Following the show, as the band members are to go to a party, Sam sees Kate—now calling herself by her middle name, Ann, who shames him for playing the songs in public. The next day, Sam visits Josh's grave and finds it vandalized as Josh Manning is revealed to have been the killer in the school shooting incident where he died. Emily arrives with cleaning supplies, and implies that it is a fairly regular occurrence, and the two parents begin to clean off the graffiti from the headstone. Afterward, the two share some tequila, and it is revealed that today is Josh's birthday. Emily tells Sam that a couple of the other parents have reached out to her to forgive them for Josh's actions, but Sam still appears to be in denial.  Emily insists that they had acted properly in their parental roles and they have nothing to feel guilty for and that Josh had to have been mentally ill to carry out such an act of violence.

Continuing to drink into the Saturday he is scheduled to work, Sam goes to his job and, finding a yard hammock, falls asleep. His employer finds and fires him. Sam assures him that he had already quit and walks away. Later that day, the other members of the band arrive with girls, and spend the afternoon on Sam's boat. As Sam goes below, the other members plead with him about a local block party they have been invited to play, and it is entirely possible it could lead to bigger and better opportunities for Rudderless in the way of airplay and exposure. But Sam is reluctant, now knowing that Josh's songs would never be accepted when people find out the truth of their authorship.

Sam visits Del the next day to acquire a new amplifier tube, and finds Del and wife Tina having gotten the RV stuck. Sam manages to get it out onto the street. Del asks him why he will not play the show, and Sam begins to question why he is really doing all of this. He arrives at Quentin's garage and insists that the song Quentin wrote will be the final song, finally pushing him out of his comfort zone.

Feeling good about the outcome, Sam makes his way toward the street stage and is surprised to find Kate/Ann talking to the other three members on the stage, presumably telling them the actual origin of the songs they all assumed Sam wrote.

She confronts him and tells him that the incident and her association with it had so interfered with her life that she had to change her name and leave school.  She had been pursued and harassed by people and media alike, asking humiliating questions, even suggesting they had been members of a cult. Quentin asks Sam if it was true, and Sam acknowledges the truth for the first time. Quentin outright refuses to play the material and strikes Sam as he is walking away despite the other two trying to persuade him to play the material one time only, and then move on. Sam again goes into a drinking binge and returns home to the marina to find the Board had the area sealed with a chain link fence. Sam attempts to climb it and falls over to the opposite side, breaking the guitar neck of his guitar strapped to his back, ruining it.

The next morning, the scheduled sailing regatta Alaird warned him about is loudly underway. The sailboat procession is disrupted by Sam playing the 1812 Overture on his electric, sailing directly into the course of the other boats, and casting some over the sides of their own craft, for which Sam is arrested. He calls Del to bail him out and is surprised when Del tells him he knew who he was the entire time, but did not know the songs were written by Josh. The next day, Sam visits the site of the shooting, and finds the erected memorial identifying the shooting victims by name. Sam breaks down in tears of grief over the guilt of Josh's actions, but finally accepts that he has lost his own son despite what he has done. Sam then visits Emily, bringing her Josh's discs, and says that one day, the new baby will want to know who his half brother was beyond what history will paint him to be.

Sam then visits Del's store and discovers Quentin has discarded his instruments, telling Del to sell them on consignment. Sam then asks if the offer on the store was a "good offer", implying that Sam would be interested in buying Del's store. He then goes to visit Quentin at the donut shop where he works, and implores him to continue playing and writing even if it is without Sam. Sam tells him that he found performing Josh's material addictive, offering catharsis to his life and the bond with Josh. He concludes the visit, having brought back Quentin's guitar cases. One contains the Les Paul that Quentin so long idolized and wanted.

Finally, Sam performs the songs he had been working on, first admitting and telling the audience who Josh was, what he had done, and that he had written the song he was about to play. Closure for Rudderless lets us see Sam has been replaced by a new guitarist. Del has been given Sam's sailboat (presumably in payment), and Emily finally decides to listen to Josh's music.
  
Sam completes the song, including (presumably) improvised lyrics about missing his son in the song's climax and leaves the stage.

Cast
 Billy Crudup as Sam
 Miles Heizer as Josh
 Anton Yelchin as Quentin
 Felicity Huffman as Emily
 Laurence Fishburne as Del
 William H. Macy as Tavern Owner / Emcee
 Jamie Chung as Lisa Martin
 Ben Kweller as Willie
 Ryan Dean as Aiken
 Selena Gomez as Kate Ann Lucas
 Kate Micucci as Peaches
 Peter Spruyt as Alaird Dupree
 Suzanne Krull as Bertie Dupree. This was Krull's final performance before her death in 2013.
 Zoe Graham as Lizzie
 Mollie Milligan as Debbie D.
 Brad Greiner as Turk
 David Flannery as Jacob Taylor
 Stacy Cunningham as Joyce
 Joey Bicicchi as Quick
 Kenneisha Thompson as Keri
 Michele Rene as Tina
 Maurice Johnson as News Reporter
 Paul Carroll as News Cameraperson

Production
Jeff Robison and Casey Twenter worked together on the screenplay for about five months in 2008. William H. Macy spent a year reworking the screenplay with the writers once he came aboard the project.
Principal photography started on April 21, 2013 in Oklahoma City and Guthrie, Oklahoma. Scenes were shot at University of Central Oklahoma. Filming wrapped on May 26, 2013.

Reception
On review aggregator Rotten Tomatoes, the film holds a rating of 63% based on 46 reviews, with an average rating of 6.2/10; the site's critical consensus reads, "Rudderless asks its cast to carry an awful lot of weight for its occasionally manipulative story; fortunately, this talented bunch—led by Billy Crudup—is often more than up to the task". On Metacritic, the film has a score of 52 out of 100, based on 19 critics, indicating "mixed or average reviews". While many critics spoke positively of Macy's direction, the soundtrack, and the performances of Crudup and Yelchin, many found issue with the third-act revelation; writing for Variety, Dennis Harvey described it as a "bewildering error in narrative judgement".

Music
The soundtrack album was released on September 30, 2014 by an independent label. It features songs by Eef Barzelay, the film band Rudderless, Selena Gomez and others. The album peaked at No. 12 on Billboard Top Soundtracks chart.
"Home" – Billy Crudup (3:56)
"Over Your Shoulder" – Rudderless (2:32)
"Hold On" – Ben Kweller & Selena Gomez (3:09)
"Sam Spirals" – Eef Barzelay (2:29)
"Beautiful Mess" – Rudderless (2:31)
"Stay with You" – Rudderless (2:31)
"The Two-Year Hungover" – Eef Barzelay (2:21)
"Real Friends" – Rudderless (2:46)
"Asshole" – Ben Limpic (3:13)
"Some Things Can't Be Thrown Away" – Eef Barzelay (1:13)
"Wheels on the Bus" – Rudderless (1:40)
"A Day on the Water" – Eef Barzelay (1:04) 
"The Gig Is Off" – Eef Barzelay (3:26)
"Sing Along" – Billy Crudup (4:26)

References

External links
 
 

2014 films
2010s musical drama films
American musical drama films
Films about music and musicians
Films about school violence
Films directed by William H. Macy
Films shot in Oklahoma
Bron Studios films
2014 directorial debut films
2014 drama films
2010s English-language films
2010s American films